Eaglesham/Bice Farm Aerodrome  is located  southwest of Eaglesham, Alberta, Canada.

See also
 Eaglesham South Aerodrome
 Eaglesham/Codesa South Aerodrome

References

Registered aerodromes in Alberta
Birch Hills County